County Sligo was a constituency represented in the Irish House of Commons until 1800.

Members of Parliament
1585 Sir Valentine Browne, James Crofton and John Marbury
1613–1615 Brian McDonagh and Thady O’Hara
1634–1635 Fearghal Ó Gadhra (Farrell O’Gara) and Tadgh O’Connor Sligo
1639–1649 Theobald Taaffe (inherited peerage 1642) and George Radcliffe (replaced April 1641 by Patrick Casey)
1661–1666 Sir Francis Gore and Robert Morgan

1689–1801

References

Historic constituencies in County Sligo
Constituencies of the Parliament of Ireland (pre-1801)
1800 disestablishments in Ireland
Constituencies disestablished in 1800